The Information Systems for Crisis Response and Management (ISCRAM) Community is an international community of researchers, practitioners and policy makers involved in or concerned about the design, development, deployment, use and evaluation of information systems for crisis response and management. The ISCRAM Community has been co-founded by Bartel Van de Walle (Tilburg University, the Netherlands), Benny Carlé (SCK-CEN Nuclear Research Center, Belgium), and Murray Turoff (New Jersey Institute of Technology).

ISCRAM Conferences 
ISCRAM conferences have been held annually since 2004.  Since 2005, the conference has alternated between Europe and the United States / Canada.

At the conference, the Mike Meleshkin best PhD student paper is awarded to the best paper written and presented by a PhD student. Past awardees are Jonas Landgren (Viktoria Institute, Sweden), Jiri Trnka (Linkoping University, Sweden), Manuel Llavador (Polytechnic University of Valencia, Spain), Valentin Bertsch (Karlsruhe University, Germany), Thomas Foulquier (Université de Sherbrooke, Canada), and the PhD students in crisis informatics at the University of Colorado at Boulder (USA).

ISCRAM-CHINA and Summer School 
Since 2005, an annual conference is also held in China, at Harbin Engineering University, with Dr. Song Yan as conference chair. The 2008 meeting is held jointly with the GI4D meeting on August 4–6, 2008.

The Summer School for PhD students took place in the Netherlands at Tilburg University in June 2006 and 2007.

ISCRAM Journal
The International Journal of Information Systems for Crisis Response and Management (IJISCRAM) is a journal which started in January 2009. Co-Editors-in-Chief are Murray Jennex (San Diego State University) and Bartel Van de Walle (Tilburg University, the Netherlands).

The mission of the International Journal of Information Systems for Crisis Response and Management (IJISCRAM) is to provide an outlet for innovative research in the area of information systems for crisis response and management. Research is expected to be rigorous but can utilize any accepted methodology and may be qualitative or quantitative in nature. The journal will provide a comprehensive cross disciplinary forum for advancing the understanding of the organizational, technical, human, and cognitive issues associated with the use of information systems in responding and managing crises of all kinds. The goal of the journal is to publish high quality empirical and theoretical research covering all aspects of information systems for crisis response and management. Full-length research manuscripts, insightful research and practice notes, and case studies will be considered for publication.

Notes

References
 
 
 Peace IT! issue 2008/1, published by CMI Finland, had a report on ISCRAM2008

External links
 ISCRAM Community web site
 ISCRAM journal website
 ISCRAM overview slideshow

Information systems